Sedgwick is a locality in Central Victoria, Australia.  It is located in the City of Greater Bendigo.

Facilities include a public hall that opened in 1958 and CFA Rural fire station.

It was named Upper Emu Creek until 1901 when it was renamed as Sedgwick after British geologist Adam Sedgwick. Emu Creek is a suburb North East of Sedgwick.

History 
The First Freehold land was granted in 1854. In 1863 The Great Eastern Mine was founded in Sedgwick. Many of the miners lived in the area around the mine so there was a hotel called the Great Eastern and a store. It was the only mine in the district. A Methodist chapel opened on the 9th of April 1873 and was in use until 1920. In 1877 a water channel running from Malmsbury to Bendigo was completed, running through the southern and western sides of Sedgwick it still exists today.  

In a public meeting in 1942, it was proposed that a bush fire brigade should be formed. The last major bush fire to burn through Sedgwick was in 1944 and burnt from Ravenswood to near Kyneton however they still have fought many smaller fires in Sedgwick and numerous larger fires in places such as Mt Macedon and Maryborough.

References

External links
 http://sedgwickcommunity.org.au/

Bendigo
Towns in Victoria (Australia)
Suburbs of Bendigo